Machines Hate Me is the first studio album by American record producer Dibiase. It was released via Alpha Pup Records on September 14, 2010. A music video was created for "Skullcrack".

Critical reception

Andrew Ryce of Resident Advisor gave the album a 4.0 out of 5, commenting that "Dibiase wisely avoids the schizophrenic channel-skipping to which his peers are so often prone, building tunes armed with an exacting focus, even when it seems like brilliant ideas are defiantly tossed off." Jacqueline Whatley of URB gave the album 4 out of 5 stars, writing, "In an hour of utter brilliance, Dibiase offers the world a taste of  what exists on the innovative  Los Angeles underground and an exciting idea of what is to come." Jeff Weiss of Los Angeles Times wrote, "Machines Hate Me represents the most complete and fully realized iteration of Dibiase's work."

Track listing

References

External links
 

2010 debut albums
Alpha Pup Records albums
Albums produced by Dibiase
Hip hop albums by American artists
Instrumental hip hop albums